Cymakra dubia is a species of sea snail, a marine gastropod mollusk in the family Mitromorphidae.

Description
The length of the shell varies between 2.5 mm and 6.2 mm.

Distribution
This marine species occurs off Honduras, Guadeloupe, Bonaire and Aruba.

References

 Olsson, A.A. & McGinty, T.L. (1958) Recent marine mollusks from the Caribbean Coast of Panama with the description of some new genera and species. Bulletins of American Paleontology, 39, 1–58.

External links
 
 
 MNHN, Paris: Cymakra dubia

dubia
Gastropods described in 1958